Epistulae ad Brutum (Letters to Brutus) is a collection of letters between Roman politician and orator Marcus Tullius Cicero and fellow politician, and conspirator against Julius Caesar, Marcus Junius Brutus. The letters in this collection, when combined with Cicero's other letters, are considered some of the most reliable sources of information for the period leading up to the fall of the Roman Republic. Cicero became acquainted with Brutus through his close friend Titus Pomponius Atticus, an admirer of Brutus. Their personal relationship likely grew during their time together in opposition to Caesar during the civil war in 49 BCE, it being firmly established by the time Cicero returned to Rome in the autumn of 47.

Traditionally divided into two books, the collection features 26 letters written from March or April to July 43 BCE — a year after the assassination of Julius Caesar, and a year before the death of Brutus in 42. The authenticity of the letters was for a long time cast into doubt, but is now generally recognized, with the exception of the first book's letters 16 and 17. These two letters resemble the style of  — exercises in rhetoric commonly used by students of the late Republic and Augustan eras. The second book of Cicero's letters to Brutus was first printed by Andreas Cratander of Basel in 1528 from a now lost manuscript obtained for him by Sichardus from the Abbey of Lorsch.

References

External links
 
 Cicero, letters to his friends: volume 3. Including the letters to Quintus and to Brutus, translated  by William Glynn Williams, (1927), Loeb Classical Library, at the Internet Archive

1st-century BC Latin books
Collections of letters
Works by Cicero